James W. Rankin (April 10, 1926 – June 28, 1978) served in the Ohio House of Representatives.

References

Members of the Ohio House of Representatives
1926 births
1978 deaths
20th-century American politicians